Szczepaniak is a Polish surname. Notable people with the surname include:

 Karolina Szczepaniak (born 1992), Polish swimmer
 Maciej Szczepaniak, Polish rally driver
 Mateusz Szczepaniak (born 1991), Polish footballer
 Mateusz Szczepaniak (born 1987), Polish speedway rider
 Robert Szczepaniak (born 1942), French footballer
 Władysław Szczepaniak (1910-1979), Polish footballer
 Yannick Szczepaniak (born 1980), French sport wrestler

Polish-language surnames
Patronymic surnames